Eulimella cylindrata is a species of sea snail, a marine gastropod mollusk in the family Pyramidellidae, the pyrams and their allies.

Description
The length of the shell attains 4.7 mm.

Distribution
This species occurs in the Atlantic Ocean off Southeast Brasil.

References

 Pimenta, A.D., Santos, F.N. & Absalao, R.S., 2011. Taxonomic revision of the genus Eulimella (Gastropoda, Pyramidellidae) from Brazil, with description of three new species. Zootaxa 3063: 22-38

External links
 To World Register of Marine Species

cylindrata
Gastropods described in 2011